Libertyville is one of two commuter railroad stations on Metra's Milwaukee District North Line in Libertyville, Illinois. In Metra's zone-based fare system, Libertyville is in zone H. As of 2018, Libertyville is the 65th busiest of Metra's 236 non-downtown stations, with an average of 801 weekday boardings.

As of December 12, 2022, Libertyville is served by 36 trains (16 inbound, 20 outbound) on weekdays, by 18 trains (nine in each direction) on Saturdays, and by all 18 trains (nine in each direction) on Sundays and holidays.

Parking is available at the station house on Lake Street and the corner of Milwaukee Avenue and Newberry Avenue. The main parking lot is accessible from the intersection of Lake Street and Brainerd Avenue, as well as Milwaukee Avenue along the south side of the tracks. A second smaller parking lot exists on the north side of Lake Street between Brainerd and Milwaukee Avenues. A parking garage is located at the corner of Lake Street and Brainerd Avenue, which can be accessed on both streets. All parking areas are south of the tracks.

One station serves the Milwaukee District North Line, while the other serves the North Central Service, with both stations in walking distance of each other.

The Libertyville station used to be east of Milwaukee Avenue near Newberry Avenue. Then a new station was built west of Milwaukee Avenue, and the old station site was converted into a gas station. Prior to that, the original station was located on First Street and was a terminus of the Chicago, Milwaukee and St. Paul Railroad. The station was relocated to the east side of Milwaukee Avenue some time after a western extension of the railroad was built to Fox Lake and on into Wisconsin. The site of the original station at First Street continued to handle freight traffic for many years but is now the site of a condominium complex, although overgrown tracks still lead from the railroad to the site.

Libertyville and most other stations on the Fox Lake Subdivision are unlike many other stations in the Metra system, due to their one-track one-platform setup. The Fox Lake subdivision is single tracked for a majority of the branch, with only  having two tracks and platforms.

References

External links

Station from Milwaukee Avenue from Google Maps Street View

Metra stations in Illinois
Former Chicago, Milwaukee, St. Paul and Pacific Railroad stations
Libertyville, Illinois
Railway stations in Lake County, Illinois
Railway stations in the United States opened in 1881